Zemendorf-Stöttera is a town in the district of Mattersburg in the Austrian state of Burgenland.

Geography
It consists of two parts, Zemendorf and Stöttera, both of which lie on the River Wulka downstream from Pöttelsdorf and upstream from Antau.

History
Until 1926, Stöttera was called Stöttern.

Population

References

Cities and towns in Mattersburg District